Yates Township may refer to the following places:

In Canada

 Yates Township, Nipissing District, Ontario (geographic / historical)

In the United States

 Yates Township, McLean County, Illinois
 Yates Township, Lake County, Michigan

See also

Yates (disambiguation)

Township name disambiguation pages